Provocation, provoke  or provoked may refer to:

 Provocation (legal), a type of legal defense in court which claims the "victim" provoked the accused's actions
 Agent provocateur, a (generally political) group that tries to goad a desired response from the group or otherwise disrupt its activity
 Provocation test, a way of medical testing for conditions such as an allergy by provoking the immune system's response
 Provoke (album), a 1998 album by Altar and their final release on Displeased Records
 Provoker (band), an American post-punk band
 Provoke (magazine), a Japanese photography and arts magazine, 1967–1968
 Provoked (film), a 2007 British film starring Aishwarya Rai and Naveen Andrews
 Provoked (Henry Rollins album), a 2008 album by Henry Rollins
 Provoked (Sunny Sweeney album), a 2014 album by Sunny Sweeney
 Provoke (horse), a racehorse

See also
False flag operation